Inspiración Espiración is Gotan Project's remix album, released in 2004.

Track listing 
 "La Cumparsita" - 0:32
 "Cité Tango" - 3:54
 "Round About Midnight" - 7:09
 "Confianzas" - 5:28
 "The Man (El Hombre Remix)" - 7:12
 "Percusiόn (Part 1)" - 4:14
 "La Del Ruso (Calexico Version)" - 7:01
 "El Capitalismo Foráneo (Antipop Consortium Remix)" - 3:26
 "Tres Y Dos (Tango)" - 2:52
 "M.A.T.H." - 2:55
 "Tríptico (Peter Kruder Trip De Luxe)" - 10:10
 "Santa Maria (Del Buen Ayre) (Pepe Bradock Wider Remix)" - 7:06
Bonus CD
 "La Cruz Del Sur" - 5:33
 Video "Sentimentale" (Director – Prisca Lobjoy) - 9:44

Personnel 
Philippe Cohen Solal
Christoph H. Müller
Eduardo Makaroff

External links 
 Review on BBC

2004 albums
Gotan Project albums
XL Recordings albums